Scenic Oaks is a census-designated place (CDP) in Bexar County, Texas, United States. It is part of the San Antonio Metropolitan Statistical Area. The population was 10,458 at the 2010 census, up from 4,957 at the 2010 census.

Geography
Scenic Oaks is located in northern Bexar County. It is bordered by Interstate 10 to the east, by the city of San Antonio to the southeast, by the CDP of Cross Mountain to the south, and to the north by Balcones Creek, forming the border with Kendall County. A portion of the CDP is taken up by the gated community of Scenic Oaks.

Demographics

As of the 2020 United States census, there were 10,458 people, 2,086 households, and 1,820 families residing in the CDP.

As of the 2000 census, there were 3,279 people, 1,190 households, and 996 families residing in the CDP. The population density was 393.7 people per square mile (152.0/km). There were 1,226 housing units at an average density of 147.2/sq mi (56.8/km). The racial makeup of the CDP was 93.69% White, 0.18% African American, 0.34% Native American, 0.95% Asian, 3.42% from other races, and 1.43% from two or more races. Hispanic or Latino of any race were 14.97% of the population.

There were 1,190 households, out of which 36.6% had children under the age of 18 living with them, 75.7% were married couples living together, 5.8% had a female householder with no husband present, and 16.3% were non-families. 14.5% of all households were made up of individuals, and 4.8% had someone living alone who was 65 years of age or older. The average household size was 2.76 and the average family size was 3.05.

In the CDP, the population was spread out, with 25.8% under the age of 18, 4.8% from 18 to 24, 24.0% from 25 to 44, 35.2% from 45 to 64, and 10.1% who were 65 years of age or older. The median age was 43 years. For every 100 females, there were 97.1 males. For every 100 females age 18 and over, there were 94.0 males.

The median income for a household in the CDP was $88,127, and the median income for a family was $97,948. Males had a median income of $60,882 versus $42,353 for females. The per capita income for the CDP was $34,980. About 3.2% of families and 3.8% of the population were below the poverty line, including 4.8% of those under age 18 and 2.9% of those age 65 or over.

Education
Scenic Oaks is served by both the Northside Independent School District and Boerne Independent School District.

The NISD portion is zoned to:
 Aue Elementary School 
 Rawlinson Middle School (San Antonio) 
 Tom C. Clark High School

References

Census-designated places in Bexar County, Texas
Census-designated places in Texas
Greater San Antonio